Andrew Daryl Cyrus (born 30 September 1976, in Lambeth) is an English former professional footballer who played in the Football League as a left back.

References

1976 births
Living people
Footballers from Lambeth
English footballers
Association football defenders
Crystal Palace F.C. players
Exeter City F.C. players
Dulwich Hamlet F.C. players
Hampton & Richmond Borough F.C. players
St. Leonards F.C. players
Carshalton Athletic F.C. players
English Football League players